Francisco Martínez may refer to:

 Francisco Martínez (basketball) (1910–1993), Mexican basketball player, competed for Mexico at the 1936 Summer Olympics
 Francisco Martínez (boxer) (born 1976), Mexican Olympic boxer
 Francisco Martínez de Baeza, colonial governor of New Mexico from 1634 to 1637
 Francisco Martínez Marina (1754–1833), Spanish jurist, historian and priest
 Francisco Martínez Soria (1902–1982), Spanish actor
 Francisco de Paula Martínez de la Rosa y Berdejo (1787–1862), Spanish statesman and dramatist
 Francisco Martínez (footballer, born 1986), Argentine footballer
 Francisco Martínez (footballer, born 1988), Andorran footballer
 Francisco Martínez (footballer, born 1990), Argentine footballer
 Kiko Martínez (born 1984), Spanish professional boxer
 Francisco Martínez Martínez (born 1950), Mexican politician
 Francisco José Martínez (born 1983), Spanish cyclist
 Francisco Martínez Romero (1993-2021), Chilean protester and juggler